Joanna Miriam Hewitt  (born 1 May 1949) is a former senior Australian public servant and policymaker. She is currently the Chair of the Australian Centre for International Agricultural Research.

Background and early life
Joanna Hewitt was born in Denmark, Western Australia on 1 May 1949. She was schooled and raised in rural Western Australia and Perth, going on to study her undergraduate degree at the University of Western Australia. She later earned a master's degree in Economics from the London School of Economics.

Career
Hewitt joined the Australian Public Service in 1972 as a trainee at the Department of Foreign Affairs.

In 1998, she was appointed Australia's Ambassador for Asia-Pacific Economic Cooperation (APEC), the pre-eminent regional forum for economic and trade dialogue.

Between 2000 and 2003 Hewitt was Australia’s Ambassador in Brussels, Belgium, and concurrently ambassador to the European Union and Luxembourg.

In 2004 she was elevated to the position of Secretary of the Department of Agriculture, Fisheries and Forestry. She stayed in the role until 2007, resigning to join her husband in Washington DC who had a posting there.

Hewitt is currently Chair of the Australian Centre for International Agricultural Research.

Awards and honours
Hewitt was made an Officer of the Order of Australia in 2008 for service to the community, particularly through significant contributions to Australia's agricultural, forestry and fishing sectors, to cross departmental policy formulation and delivery, and to international relations through fostering diplomatic, trade and cultural interests'.

In 2012, she was awarded an Honorary Degree of Doctor of Economics from the University of Western Australia.

In late 2016, the Department of Foreign Affairs and Trade named one of its 16 meeting rooms in honour of Hewitt, in recognition of her work as a pioneering female diplomat.

References

Additional sources 

Australian public servants
Living people
1949 births
University of Western Australia alumni
Alumni of the London School of Economics
Officers of the Order of Australia
Ambassadors of Australia for Asia-Pacific Economic Cooperation
Ambassadors of Australia to Belgium
Ambassadors of Australia to Luxembourg
Ambassadors of Australia to the European Union
People from Denmark, Western Australia
Australian women ambassadors